West Jefferson is a village in Madison County, Ohio, United States.  The population was 4,222 at the 2010 census.  Located along U.S. Route 40, the village has a fairly close relationship with the surrounding township, which include various out-of-corporation-limit neighborhoods (including Haymarket Road, Olmstead Road, Forrest Lake Estates, Goodson Road/Enchanted Valley, and North and South Road). The village has a "Commerce Park" at its western edge which include Target and  Amazon  Distribution Centers, a Krazy Glue factory, and Jefferson Industries.

History
West Jefferson was originally called New Hampton, and under the latter name was platted  1831.  A post office called West Jefferson has been in operation since 1833.

2021 shooting
On May 24, 2021, a mass shooting occurred at an apartment complex in West Jefferson. Three men and one woman were killed, with three of the victims being found inside the building and one outside. A motive has not been determined for the shooting. On June 14, a suspect was arrested and charged for the killings. The shooting marked West Jefferson's first homicides since April 2012.

Geography
West Jefferson is located at  (39.943244, −83.275855).

Demographics

2010 census
As of the census of 2010, there were 4,222 people, 1,617 households, and 1,149 families residing in the village. The racial makeup of the village was 97.6% White, 0.5% African American, 0.3% Asian, 0.2% from other races, and 1.4% from two or more races. Hispanic or Latino of any race were 0.9% of the population.

There were 1,617 households, of which 35.4% had children under the age of 18 living with them, 51.3% were married couples living together, 13.7% had a female householder with no husband present, 6.1% had a male householder with no wife present, and 28.9% were non-families. 25.7% of all households were made up of individuals, and 11.4% had someone living alone who was 65 years of age or older. The average household size was 2.55 and the average family size was 3.02.

The median age in the village was 38.5 years. 25.5% of residents were under the age of 18; 7.9% were between the ages of 18 and 24; 25.4% were from 25 to 44; 25.6% were from 45 to 64; and 15.6% were 65 years of age or older. The gender makeup of the village was 48.9% male and 51.1% female.

2000 census
As of the census of 2000, there were 4,331 people, 1,631 households, and 1,180 families residing in the village. The population density was 1,306.0 people per square mile (503.7/km). There were 1,704 housing units at an average density of 513.8 per square mile (198.2/km). The racial makeup of the village was 99.01% White, 0.02% African American, 0.16% Native American, 0.14% Asian, 0.02% Pacific Islander, 0.09% from other races, and 0.55% from two or more races. Hispanic or Latino of any race were 0.58% of the population.

There were 1,631 households, out of which 36.7% had children under the age of 18 living with them, 56.5% were married couples living together, 11.1% had a female householder with no husband present, and 27.6% were non-families. 22.6% of all households were made up of individuals, and 9.6% had someone living alone who was 65 years of age or older. The average household size was 2.60 and the average family size was 3.07.

In the village, the population was spread out, with 27.4% under the age of 18, 7.9% from 18 to 24, 29.5% from 25 to 44, 21.9% from 45 to 64, and 13.4% who were 65 years of age or older. The median age was 35 years. For every 100 females there were 95.4 males. For every 100 females age 18 and over, there were 90.7 males.

The median income for a household in the village was $41,949, and the median income for a family was $50,046. Males had a median income of $36,073 versus $26,734 for females. The per capita income for the village was $20,425. About 6.1% of families and 5.9% of the population were below the poverty line, including 7.6% of those under age 18 and 6.5% of those age 65 or over.

Library
West Jefferson is served by the Hurt/Battelle Memorial Library. In 2005, the library loaned more than 81,000 items to its 9,500 cardholders. Total holdings are over 57,000 volumes with over 60 periodical subscriptions. The Library also has a large collection of VHS tapes.

References

External links
 
 Hurt/Battelle Memorial Library

Villages in Madison County, Ohio
Villages in Ohio
National Road